Rev. Edward Aloysius "Monk" Malloy, C.S.C. (born May 3, 1941), is an American Catholic priest, academic, and former college basketball player who is a member of the Congregation of Holy Cross. He is best known for his service as the 16th president of the University of Notre Dame from 1987 to 2005.

Biography
Edward Malloy was born on May 3, 1941, in Washington, D.C. He attended Archbishop Carroll High School, where he was part of a basketball team that included John Thompson and Tom Hoover. During his senior season, the team started a 55-game winning streak.

He received a BA and MA in English from the University of Notre Dame in 1963 and 1967; and an M.A. in Theology in 1969. As an undergraduate at Notre Dame, he was on the basketball team, but he never started. He was ordained as priest in 1970, and he received a PhD in Christian ethics from Vanderbilt University in 1975.

Presidency of the University of Notre Dame
In 1974, he started teaching at Notre Dame. In 1986, he was elected by the trustees as Vice-President and Associate Provost. He served as President from 1987 to 2005.

Father Malloy sits on the Board of Trustees of Vanderbilt University and the University of Portland, the University of St. Thomas, and the University of Notre Dame Australia. He has served in leadership roles as chair of the American Council on Education (ACE), the Association of Governing Boards of Universities and Colleges (AGB), and Campus Compact, and has been an active participant on the Business-Higher Education Forum, the general council of the International Federation of Catholic Universities (IFCU), the board of the Association of Catholic Colleges and Universities (ACCU), the board of directors of the National Association of Independent Colleges and Universities (NAICU), the National Committee on Higher Education and the Health of Youth, the board of advisors of The Bernardin Center for Theology and Ministry at Catholic Theological Union of Chicago, the board of directors of the NCAA Foundation, and the editorial advisory board of The Presidency, the magazine of the American Council on Education.

He has been a member of the advisory board of the AmeriCorps and National Civilian Community Corps (NCCC), a founding director of the Points of Light Foundation, member of the board of governors of the Boys and Girls Clubs of America, and a member of the State of Indiana Community Service and Volunteer Committee and the Indiana Commission on Community Service (Indiana AmeriCorps). He is a recipient of the National Association of Basketball Coaches Balfour Silver Anniversary Award.

He has been a member of the National Advisory Council on Alcohol Abuse and Alcoholism, President George H. W. Bush's Advisory Council on Drugs, the Community Anti-Drug Coalitions of America, and the Governor's Commission for a Drug-Free Indiana. He currently serves on the board of directors of the National Center on Addiction and Substance Abuse (CASA) at Columbia University, for which he has chaired commissions on Substance Abuse Among America's Adolescents and on Substance Abuse at Colleges and Universities. He currently is co-chair of the subcommittee on college drinking of the National Institute on Alcohol Abuse and Alcoholism, a component of the National Institutes of Health, and for CASA, he now chairs the National Commission on Substance Abuse and Sports. He recently served as chair of the Sports Wagering Task Force established by the NCAA.

He has served the Catholic Church on the Vatican Secretariat for Non-Believers, the Ex Corde Ecclesiae and Bishops-Presidents committees of the U.S. Catholic Conference, the World Congress of Catholic Educators, and the Sister Thea Bowman Black Catholic Educational Foundation. He serves on the board of the National Leadership Roundtable on Church Management. He is a member of the Catholic Theological Society of America and the Society of Christian Ethics.

Career statistics

College

|-
| style="text-align:left;"| 1960–61
| style="text-align:left;"| Notre Dame
| 3 || – || – || .250 || – || – || .7 || – || – || – || .7
|-
| style="text-align:left;"| 1961–62
| style="text-align:left;"| Notre Dame
| 11 || – || – || .500 || – || .200 || .8 || – || – || – || 1.7
|-
| style="text-align:left;"| 1962–63
| style="text-align:left;"| Notre Dame
| 7 || – || – || .188 || – || .000 || .6 || – || – || – || .9
|- class="sortbottom"
| style="text-align:center;" colspan="2"| Career
| 21 || – || – || .342 || – || .167 || .7 || – || – || – || 1.3

Bibliography

Biography Monk's Tale in three volumes:

Malloy, Edward A. (2016). Monk's Tale: The Presidential Years 1987-2005. Monk's Tale Volume 3. University of Notre Dame Press. p. 456. .

References

1941 births
Living people
Presidents of the University of Notre Dame
University of Notre Dame faculty
University of Notre Dame alumni
Notre Dame Fighting Irish men's basketball players
Vanderbilt University alumni
Congregation of Holy Cross
American Roman Catholic priests
University of Notre Dame Trustees
American men's basketball players
Archbishop Carroll High School (Washington, D.C.) alumni